Peak Hill is the name of a goldfield, locality and the site of a gold mining ghost town in the Murchison Region of Western Australia. The gold mine covers 2,162 hectares and consists of four open-cut mines, titled Main, Jubilee, Fiveways and Harmony.

In the adjacent region to the locality there are considerable non auriferous mineral deposits. Adjacent fields included the Horseshoe field.

Early exploration at the site occurred in the 1890s, when gold was discovered by William John Wilson in 1892. The townsite was gazetted in 1897, and the field has had varied fortunes even in early years. Before 1913, the mine produced some 270,000 ounces of gold. Peak Hill was also included as a location in a regional newspaper network of more outlying mining communities in the 1920s and 1930s.

The population of the town was 190 (180 males and 10 females) in 1898.

A Walker was the proprietor of the Peak Hill General Store until 1954, when he retired to his Daughter's Farm (Nee Campbell) McCourt Farm, Peppermint Grove Beach, South of Capel. Mr Walker was the last full-time resident of Peak Hill.	

In the 1970s it was reduced to a ghost town with a few remaining residents, however in the 1980s activity resumed, producing around 650,000 ounces of gold. The mine became dormant again the 2000s.

Montezuma Mining Company Ltd purchased the mine from Barrick Gold and Rio Tinto in August 2007 for $1 million cash and $600,000 of environmental bonds. Montezuma negotiated an underwriting agreement with Cunningham Securities, a Perth broker, in January 2008 to raise money for further exploration. Montezuma is seeking up to $3 million to drill at four priority zones, hoping to recommence mining in an area that has historically produced over 900,000 ounces of gold.

References

Ghost towns in Western Australia
Mining towns in Western Australia
Shire of Meekatharra